Carl Herman Theodor "Alfred" Lagerheim, (4 October 1843 – 23 May 1924) was a Swedish politician and diplomat. Lagerheim was born in Copenhagen, Denmark and was a student in Uppsala in 1859 and graduated in 1861. He became an attaché in Paris in 1862, second secretary at the Foreign Ministry in 1865, legation secretary in Saint Petersburg in 1870 and boss for UDs political department in 1871. He became the cabinet secretary between 1899 and 1904.

References

1843 births
1924 deaths
Ambassadors of Sweden to Germany
Swedish Ministers for Foreign Affairs
People from Copenhagen